Brian Robert Jackson (born October 11, 1952) is an American keyboardist, flautist, singer, composer, and producer known for his collaborations with Gil Scott-Heron in the 1970s. The sound of Jackson's Rhodes electric piano and flute accompaniments featured prominently in many of their compositions, most notably on "The Bottle" and "Your Daddy Loves You" from their first official collaboration Winter in America.

Early life
Jackson was born in Brooklyn, New York, United States, to Clarence and Elsie Jackson, respectively a New York State parole officer and a librarian at the Ford Foundation. He spent the first two years of his life in Bedford-Stuyvesant, Brooklyn, later sharing a house in the Flatbush section of Brooklyn with his uncle Howard, wife Dorothy and young cousin Sidney until his parents separated by the time he was five.

Unable to take on the responsibility of sharing mortgage payments alone, Elsie was forced to move to a one-bedroom apartment in Crown Heights, Brooklyn until she remarried in 1968.

Jackson studied music in Fort Greene with his mother's childhood teacher, Hepzibah Ross (fondly called 'Aunt Heppie') with whom he took lessons for seven years. When Elsie was unable to continue payments for lessons, Aunt Heppie granted him a scholarship, simply stating that Jackson showed 'great promise.'

His mother later married Alvin S.Lovell a General Practitioner from Bedford Stuyvesant who often donated his services to uninsured residents of the community. In 1968, their daughter and Brian's sister, Alison Lovell, was born.

From 1965 until 1969, Jackson attended Brooklyn's Erasmus Hall High School, where he met other musicians and began to form bands on the outside while participating in school music programs.

Career
Jackson met Gil Scott-Heron while the two were attending Lincoln University (Pennsylvania). They began a decade-long writing, producing, and recording partnership. Jackson composed most of the music that he and Scott-Heron together performed and recorded. In 1971, the two released their first album together, Pieces of a Man, with Ron Carter on bass. Other notable albums include Free Will (1972) and Winter in America (1974), which was the first to have Jackson receive co-billing, and which was later described by Barney Hoskyns in UNCUT as "a masterwork of ghetto melancholia and stark political gravitas". His biggest hit was with Scott-Heron, 1974's "The Bottle". By 1979, they had recorded ten albums, with other unreleased material surfacing on subsequent Scott-Heron releases following their 1980 split.

Jackson continued to be active in the 1980s and 1990s, working with Earth, Wind & Fire, Stevie Wonder, Will Downing and Gwen Guthrie. Jackson's first solo album, Gotta Play (released October 2000), included guest performances by Roy Ayers and Scott-Heron. Jackson's other credits include work with Roy Ayers, Kool and the Gang, Janis Siegel (of Manhattan Transfer), Will Downing, Gwen Guthrie, Pete Miser of (Radio Free Brooklyn) on his solo album, Camouflage is Relative, Alabama 3 MOR, and Carl Hancock Rux (Homeostasis).

In 2022, Brian Jackson released his first solo album in over 20 years, This Is Brian Jackson. It was produced by Phenomenal Handclap Band founder Daniel Collás and released on BBE Music.

Discography

with Gil Scott-Heron
Pieces of a Man (1971) Flying Dutchman
Free Will (1972) Flying Dutchman

Gil Scott-Heron & Brian Jackson

Albums
Winter in America (1974), Strata East - Billboard Jazz #6
The First Minute of a New Day (1975), Arista - Billboard Jazz #5, R&B #8
From South Africa to South Carolina (1975), Arista - Billboard Jazz #12, R&B #28
It's Your World (live) (1976), Arista - Billboard Jazz #20, R&B #34
Bridges (1977), Arista - Billboard Jazz #16
Secrets (1978), Arista - Billboard Jazz #3, R&B #10
1980 (1980), Arista - Billboard Jazz #7, R&B #22

Singles
"Ain't No Such Thing as Superman" 7" (1975), Arista
"(What's the Word) Johannesburg" 7" (1975), Arista
"The Bottle" 7" (1976), Arista
"Hello Sunday, Hello Road" 7" (1977), Arista
"Under the Hammer" 7" (1978), Arista
"Angel Dust" 7" (1978), Arista
"Show Bizness" 7" (1978), Arista
"Shut 'Um Down" 7"/12" (1980), Arista
"Willing" 7" (1980), Arista
"The Bottle (drunken mix)" 7"/12" (1980), Inferno

Brian Jackson
Gotta Play (2000), RMG
Kentyah Presents: Evolutionary Minded featuring M1, Brian Jackson and the New Midnight Band (2013), Motéma
This Is Brian Jackson (2022), BBE

with Kool & The Gang
Something Special (1981), De-Lite

with Will Downing
Will Downing (1988), Island/Polygram
Come Together as One (1989), Island/Polygram

with Roy Ayers
Drive (1988) Ichiban

with Gwen Guthrie
Hot Times (1990), Reprise

with Alabama 3
M.O.R. (2007), One Little Indian

with Les Nubians
Nü Revolution (2011) Shanachie

with Carl Hancock Rux
 Homeostasis (2013) CD Baby

with Escort
City Life (2019) Escort Records

with Charnett Moffett
Bright New Day (2019) Motéma

with Ali Shaheed Muhammad and Adrian Younge
Jazz Is Dead 8 (2021) Jazz Is Dead

References

External links
 – official website

Brian Jackson at MySpace
Brian Jackson interview at Underyourskin

1952 births
Living people
American multi-instrumentalists
Lincoln University (Pennsylvania) alumni
African-American male singer-songwriters
American jazz keyboardists
Musicians from Brooklyn
Strata-East Records artists
Singer-songwriters from New York (state)
Erasmus Hall High School alumni
Jazz musicians from New York (state)
21st-century African-American male singers
20th-century African-American male singers